Code page 1287 (CCSID 1287), also known as CP1287, DEC Greek (8-bit) and EL8DEC, is one of the code pages implemented for the VT220 terminals. It supports the Greek language.

Code page layout

See also
DEC Multinational Character Set (MCS)
8-bit DEC Turkish (Code page 1288)
8-bit DEC Hebrew
8-bit DEC Cyrillic (KOI-8 Cyrillic)
7-bit DEC Greek

References

1287
Digital Equipment Corporation